Bébé le Strange is the fifth studio album by American rock band Heart, released on February 14, 1980, by Epic Records. It was the first album without founding member Roger Fisher on lead guitar, who had left the band months prior along with his brother Michael.

The album was a commercial success, peaking at number five on the US Billboard 200 and spending 22 weeks on the chart. On May 5, 1980, it was certified Gold by the Recording Industry Association of America (RIAA). Bébé le Strange spawned the singles "Even It Up" (backed by the Tower of Power horn section) and the title track. Some of the backing vocals were provided by Don Wilhelm, who had been in a group called The Army with Steve Fossen and Roger Fisher in the 1960s.

Record World said that of the single "Raised on You" that "Anne's lavish lead is enhanced by bold keyboard runs and Nancy's confident guitar."

On June 29, 2004, the album was re-released by Epic and Legacy Recordings in a remastered expanded edition, containing two bonus track: the studio outtake "Jackleg Man" and a live version of "Break".

Track listing

Personnel
Credits adapted from the liner notes of Bébé le Strange.

Heart
 Ann Wilson – lead vocals ; tambourine ; bass ; backup vocals ; drums, alto flute, piano 
 Nancy Wilson – guitars ; backup vocals ; rhythm guitars ; Mellotron ; acoustic guitars ; electric guitar ; lead guitar ; lead vocals, all instruments except drums 
 Howard Leese – guitars ; lead guitar ; synthesizer ; backward solo ; electric guitar ; acoustic guitars ; backup vocals ; rhythm guitars ; keyboards 
 Michael Derosier – drums ; rhythm instruments 
 Steve Fossen – bass

Additional musicians
 Sue Ennis – guitar ; piano 
 Chrissy Shefts – guitar 
 Connie – acoustic guitars 
 Don Wilhelm – backup vocals 
 Gary Humphreys – backup vocals 
 Tower of Power (Lenny Pickett, Greg Adams, Emilio Castillo, Steve Kupka, Mic Gillette) – horn section

Technical
 Mike Flicker – production, engineering, mixing
 Connie – production
 Howie – production
 Rob Perkins – engineering
 Armin Steiner – horn engineering 
 Stewart Whitmore – horn engineering assistance 
 John Golden – mastering at Kendun Recorders (Burbank, California)

Artwork
 Tony Lane – art direction
 Tim Girvin – logo graphics
 Jeff Burger – photography

Charts

Weekly charts

Year-end charts

Certifications

Notes

References

1980 albums
Albums produced by Mike Flicker
Epic Records albums
Heart (band) albums